Lucía Ramos Nombela (Fuenlabrada, January 21, 1991) is a Spanish actress known mainly for her participation in the teen series Física o Química as Teresa.

Biography 
Her beginnings in the small screen are given in such popular series as El comisario, Cuéntame como pasó, El internado, Yo soy Bea or Hermanos y detectives,  she had guest appearances. When she was only 18 years old, she was part of the cast of the TV-movie Inocentes (2010) directed by Daniel Calparsoro and broadcast by Telecinco. It's a thriller about prostitution based on real events.

However, the role that made her most known was that of Teresa in the last three seasons of the series Física o Química (2010-2011), a series of great popularity and audience, broadcast on Antena 3.

In 2012, she joined the cast of the new series directed by José Luis Moreno, Todo es posible en el bajo, broadcast on Telemadrid. She has also participated episodically in series such as El don de Alba and La que se avecina, both on Telecinco.

The actress has also participated in important national and international advertising campaigns, including brands such as Adidas with Zinedine Zidane, and Mustang, a brand for which she was the image for two campaigns with actor Mario Casas.

In 2014 she starred in the film En apatía, secuelas del odio, alongside Christian Casas and Álvaro Díaz. She has also participated in the films No quiero ser recuerdo, by Óscar Parra de Carrizosa, and Novatos, by Pablo Aragüés.

In 2016 she shot the miniseries Marcados, alongside Natalia Sánchez and Jaime Olías, which is still pending release. Also that year she joined the cast of the docufiction Centro Médico, broadcast by Televisión Española, where she plays the physiotherapist Marta Palacio.

Filmography

Cinema

Television

Theater

Videoclips 

 «Tu alma se clavó en mi corazón» by Salva Ortega (2012).
 «Vuela» by SN2 (2013).
 «Disaster» by Mario Jefferson (2013).
 «No pide tanto idiota» by Maldita Nerea (2015).
 «Repetíamos» by Abraham Mateo (2021).

References

External links 
 Lucía Ramos on IMDb

Spanish television actresses
Living people
1991 births